"Everybody" was the winner of the Eurovision Song Contest 2001, performed in English by Tanel Padar and Dave Benton, along with 2XL, for . It was the first victory by one of the countries that debuted in the contest in the 1990s after the fall of the Iron Curtain.

Background
The song was performed twentieth on the night, following 's Michelle with "Wer Liebe lebt" and preceding 's Fabrizio Faniello with "Another Summer Night".

Tanel had previously provided backing vocals for Estonia's 2000 entry, sung by Eda-Ines Etti, his then girlfriend. Tanel and Dave were supported by a backing group of four, 2XL: Lauri Pihlap, Kaido Põldma, Sergei Morgun and Indrek Soom.

The song was followed as Estonian representative at the 2002 contest, held in the Estonian capital of Tallinn, by Sahlene with "Runaway".

Content
Lyrically, the song is simply an invitation to party, with the duo singing that "every night's a Friday night". The song is famous for two major reasons: Benton is the oldest contestant to win the grand prize as well as the first Black contestant to do so. Maarja-Liis Ilus has recorded a cover version.

Track listings 
CD single
 "Everybody" (Original Version) – 2:56
 "Everybody" (Instrumental) – 2:56

CD Maxi-single
 "Everybody" (Original Version) – 3:00
 "Everybody" (Pierre J's Radio Mix) – 3:39
 "Everybody" (Pierre J's Club Mix) – 7:06
 "Everybody" (Instrumental) – 2:57

Charts

References

Eurovision songs of Estonia
Eurovision songs of 2001
Eurovision Song Contest winning songs
Universal Records singles
2001 songs
Songs with music by Ivar Must